Marguerite Leferon (née Galart; d. after 1679), was an accused in the famous Affair of the Poisons.

She belonged to the Parisian Bourgeoisie and was the wife of judge Leferon. In 1669, she poisoned her husband with a poison sold to her by La Voisin and married her lover, De Prade. When De Prade proved to be a fortune hunter she decided to murder him as well, which was prevented by his escape. Leferon was arrested during the Poison Affair in 1679. La Voisin, on her way to execution, named her as her client. She was proven guilty, but was still only sentenced to exile from the capital and a fine of 1500 livres.

The case against Marguerite Leferon and Françoise de Dreux, as well as that of Marguerite de Poulaillon, attracted attention as they were the first clients and the first members of the upper classes to be implicated in the affair.  The light sentences imposed on them, despite their guilt, was considered damaging to the legitimacy of the court.  This was obvious proof of class discrimination, as others accused for the same crime in the case, but of a different social class, were sentenced to execution. One example was that of Madame Philbert, who in 1673 murdered her carpenter husband Brunet by poison of Marie Bosse in order to marry her lover, Philippe Rebille Philbert: her crime was identical to that of Leferon, but she was sentenced to hang after having her right hand cut off.

References 
 Frantz Funck-Brentano: Princes and Poisoners Or Studies of the Court of Louis XIV
 H Noel Williams: Madame de Montespan and Louis XIV
 Anne Somerset - The Affair of the Poisons: Murder, Infanticide, and Satanism at the Court of Louis XIV (St. Martin's Press (October 12, 2003) )

1679 crimes
Year of death missing
Year of birth missing
French female murderers
Mariticides
Affair of the Poisons